

398001–398100 

|-id=045
| 398045 Vitudurum ||  || Vitudurum was a Roman neighborhood that was built around 1 CE in today's district of Oberwinterthur in the Swiss city of Winterthur. || 
|}

398101–398200 

|-id=188
| 398188 Agni ||  || Agni is the Vedic god of fire. He represents the vital spark of life, and the fire and brilliance of the Sun, lightning, and comets. || 
|}

398201–398300 

|-bgcolor=#f2f2f2
| colspan=4 align=center | 
|}

398301–398400 

|-bgcolor=#f2f2f2
| colspan=4 align=center | 
|}

398401–398500 

|-bgcolor=#f2f2f2
| colspan=4 align=center | 
|}

398501–398600 

|-bgcolor=#f2f2f2
| colspan=4 align=center | 
|}

398601–398700 

|-bgcolor=#f2f2f2
| colspan=4 align=center | 
|}

398701–398800 

|-bgcolor=#f2f2f2
| colspan=4 align=center | 
|}

398801–398900 

|-bgcolor=#f2f2f2
| colspan=4 align=center | 
|}

398901–399000 

|-bgcolor=#f2f2f2
| colspan=4 align=center | 
|}

References 

398001-399000